Kue asida is an Indonesian pudding dessert made of water with mixture of wheat flour, sugar, cinnamon, cardamom, butter and honey. This dessert is typical Moluccan cuisine and also found in Malay Indonesian and Arab Indonesian cuisine. It usually served during Ramadan for iftar. Kue asida is similar to dodol.

Origin
The origin of kue asida is believed to be derived from the Middle Eastern asida that was introduced by Arab merchants throughout the Maluku Islands.

See also

Cuisine of Indonesia
Arab Indonesian cuisine
Malay cuisine
Asida
Kue

References

Kue
Puddings
Wheat dishes
Indonesian desserts
Iftar foods